Tömönkü Norus is a village in Ysyk-Ata District of the Chüy Region of Kyrgyzstan. Its population was 1,191 in 2021.

References

Populated places in Chüy Region